is an annual award for manga, sponsored by the Japan Cartoonists Association. The prize was first awarded in 1972.

Prizes
Recipients of the Grand Prize receive a gold plaque, a medal, and a cash prize of ¥500,000. Recipients of the Excellence Prize receive a silver plaque, a medal, and a cash prize of ¥200,000. Recipients of the Special Award receive the same items as the winner(s) of the Grand Prize.

Recipients

See also

 List of manga awards

References

External links
 Japanese official website

Manga awards
Awards established in 1972
Comics awards
1972 establishments in Japan